Aleksejs Saveljevs (born 30 January 1999) is a Latvian footballer who plays as a midfielder for latvian club, FK Auda.

Club career
He started his senior career in the Latvian Higher League with Babīte in 2017. The club was excluded from the league for match fixing and he returned to junior football.

On 11 August 2017, he joined Italian club Verona on loan with an option to buy and was assigned to the club's Under-19 squad. On 30 May 2018, Verona exercised their option and purchased his rights, and he signed a 3-year contract with the club. In 2018–19 season, he continued to play for Verona's youth team. He received two call-ups to the senior squad (once in Serie B and once in Coppa Italia), but did not appear on the field.

On 31 January 2020, he joined Serie C club Rende on loan. He made his professional debut for Rende on 9 February 2020 in a game against Paganese. He substituted Alberto Libertazzi in the 76th minute. On 16 February 2020, he scored his first professional goal, an added-time equalizer in a 2–2 draw against Potenza. On 26 February 2020, he made his first start against Cavese. After two more games, the season was abandoned due to the COVID-19 pandemic in Italy.

On 14 September 2020 he signed with Serie C club Mantova.

On 16 July 2021, he returned to Latvia and signed with Riga.

On 9 march 2022, he loaned to FK Auda from Riga FC for a season. On 20 october 2022, he brought his club to win the 2022 latvian football cup for the first time in history.

International career
He amassed 50 appearances for Latvia on different junior levels. In November 2018, he was called up for the first time to the senior Latvia national football team for the 2018–19 UEFA Nations League games against Kazakhstan and Andorra, but remained on the bench on that occasion.
Seveljevs made his first appearance for Latvia on 11 November 2020 in the Friendly match against San Marino.

Career statistics

International goals

Honours
 FK Auda
 Latvian Cup: 2022

References

External links
 

1999 births
Living people
Footballers from Riga
Latvian footballers
Latvia youth international footballers
Latvia under-21 international footballers
Latvia international footballers
Latvian people of Russian descent
Association football midfielders
Hellas Verona F.C. players
Rende Calcio 1968 players
Mantova 1911 players
Riga FC players
Latvian Higher League players
Serie C players
Latvian expatriate footballers
Expatriate footballers in Italy